The Tupolev Tu-142 (142; NATO reporting name: Bear F/J) is a Soviet/Russian maritime reconnaissance and anti-submarine warfare (ASW) aircraft derived from the Tu-95 turboprop strategic bomber. A specialised communications variant designated Tu-142MR was tasked with long-range communications duties with Soviet ballistic missile submarines. The Tu-142 was designed by the Tupolev design bureau, and manufactured by the Kuibyshev Aviation and Taganrog Machinery Plants from 1968 to 1994. Formerly operated by the Soviet Navy and Ukrainian Air Force, the Tu-142 currently serves with the Russian Navy.

Developed in response to the American Polaris programme, the Tu-142 grew out of the need for a viable Soviet ASW platform. It succeeded the failed Tu-95PLO project, Tupolev's first attempt at modifying the Tu-95 for maritime use. The Tu-142 differed from the Tu-95 in having a stretched fuselage to accommodate specialised equipment for its ASW and surveillance roles, a reinforced undercarriage to support rough-field capability, improved avionics and weapons, and enhancements to general performance. The Tu-142's capability was incrementally improved while the type was in service, eventually resulting in the Tu-142MZ, the final long-range Tu-142 with highly sophisticated combat avionics and a large payload. Tupolev also converted a number of Tu-142s as avionics (Tu-142MP) and engine (Tu-142LL) testbeds.

Design and development

Early designs

Polaris became operational on  that year, when the George Washington left Charleston, South Carolina, with a complement of nuclear-armed Polaris missiles.

The Soviet government consequently ordered Tupolev and other aircraft design bureaus to study possible dedicated anti-submarine warfare (ASW) designs. Tupolev initially designed the Tu-95PLO (protivolodochnaya oborona, or ASW), a development of the Tu-95 equipped with sonobuoys, anti-submarine mines and torpedoes. The design was dropped, however, because it lacked a powerful radar, thermal imaging (infrared) system and magnetic anomaly detector (MAD). On , the Council of Ministers (the highest executive and administrative body of the Soviet Union) issued a directive to Tupolev requiring his bureau to develop a long-range ASW aircraft.

The resultant design was named Tu-142 and had features in common with the Tu-95RT. The ventral and dorsal gun turrets were removed, as was the large dielectric radome housing the Uspeh radar system, which was replaced by a thermal imaging system located in a smaller fairing. This left the tail turret with twin 23-mm AM-23 cannons, along with electronic countermeasures, as the only defensive armament. The aircraft's search-and-targeting system featured Berkut (Golden Eagle) . A complex navigation system was integrated with the weapons targeting system. The area of the elevators was increased by 14%, and improved hydraulic actuators were fitted. Metal fuel tanks replaced rubber bladders. To allow the Tu-142 to operate from semi-prepared runways, the Tu-95's four-wheel main undercarriage bogies were replaced with 12-wheel units; the main undercarriage fairings were also modified.

Early testing indicated that the fuselage needed to be lengthened by at least   to accommodate new combat equipment. Therefore, the second prototype (c/n 4201) joined the flight-test programme on 3 September with a   front fuselage stretch, a modification found on all subsequent Tu-142s. In May 1970, the Soviet Naval Aviation (AV-MF) – the air arm of the Soviet Navy – began receiving production Tu-142s for operational trials.

Improved variants

During early operations, the Tu-142 revealed several shortcomings. The aircraft's rough-field capability was found to be of limited use, so the 12-wheel bogies used on the first 12 of 36 aircraft were replaced with four-wheel reinforced bogies from the Tu-114 airliner; consequently, the wheel-wells in the engine nacelle were made slimmer. The modified aircraft also introduced a crew rest area for long-duration missions, and was assigned the codename ("Bear F" Mod 1); from 1968 to 1972 the Kuibyshev Plant produced a total of 18 Tu-142s.

In the early 1970s, production of Tu-142s was switched to the  near the Black Sea. It has been speculated that the change to the idle plant was to give employment to the workers there. The move required many improvements to the plant and the surrounding area, including the establishment of new assembly shops, the installation of new machinery and tooling, the re-training of the workforce, and the building of a new airfield. Preparation took place until 1975, when production of the first Tu-142 began. The Tu-142s built by Taganrog incorporated the changes found on the last of the Kuibyshev aircraft. Differences included a   stretch to the front fuselage and a redesigned cockpit. Additional changes included new two-axle main undercarriage bogies. This version was given the factory designation Tu-142M, which was not adopted by the Soviet Navy; NATO codenamed it "Bear-F" Mod 2.

As the 1970s progressed, silencing technology in submarines rendered acoustic-band sonobuoys and trigger devices ineffective. During 1961 and 1962, the Soviet Union conducted research and development into an explosive sound system (ESS) – used to locate deep-diving submarines – under the name Udar (Blow). In 1965, work had started on sonobuoy systems using ESS to be integrated with the Berkut radar. The programme was postponed when one of the aircraft intended to carry it, the Ilyushin Il-38, was found to be incompatible. The developments instead resulted in the Udar-75, which was featured in a new search and targeting system (STS) of the Taganrog-built Tu-142Ms.

A new target acquisition system dubbed Korshun-K, the cornerstone of which was the Korshun (Kite) radar, was installed on all subsequent Tu-142s. This system was used for detecting surfaced and submerged submarines, communicating with other ASW aircraft and ground bases, and performing navigational and tactical tasks. The first three Tu-142Ms were the first aircraft to be equipped with this system, and thus were redesignated Tu-142MK . It was the first Tu-142 to feature a MAD, its MMS-106 Ladoga system being mounted in an aft-facing fairing atop the vertical stabiliser. , conducted during , found that the aircraft's avionics were extremely unreliable; like , these problems were apparently ignored when a directive issued on  cleared the Tu-142MK for operational service.

Technological upgrades

Even as the Tu-142MK entered service, its Korshun-K STS was already becoming obsolete. Work began on yet another improved Tu-142, resulting in the Tu-142MZ  with the Korshun-KN-N STS. This consisted of Nashatyr-Nefrit (Ammonia/Jade) ASW avionics, which included the Zarechye sonar system. As well as the RGB-1A and RGB-2 buoys of the Berkut, the Tu-142MZ was compatible with the RGB-16 and RGB-26 buoys. When working with the ASW avionics, these buoys provided 50% greater coverage. The Kuznetsov NK-12MV were replaced by the more-powerful NK-12MP engines, and for the first time, the Tu-142 had an independent engine-starting capability with the addition of the TA-12 auxiliary power unit. This variant was distinguished from earlier "Bear Fs" by the chin fairings housing several antennas.

The flight test programme started in 1985 with the maiden flight of a converted Tu-142M fitted with the advanced avionics; state acceptance trials began within two years. Test results proved excellent, as the aircraft successfully tracked nuclear-powered submarines of the Northern and Pacific Fleets. The aircraft became operational with Russian Naval Aviation (AV-MP) in 1993. The last Tu-142MZ rolled off the Taganrog production line the following year, bringing an end to a 26-year production run during which 100 Tu-142s were produced.

A communications variant designated Tu-142MR ("Bear J") was the last production version of the Tu-142. It was tasked with long-range communications duties with Soviet ballistic missile submarines, a role similar to that of the Boeing E-6 Mercury. The Tu-142MR differed from the ASW Tu-142s in having less-sophisticated avionics, but had a long trailing wire radio aerial to relay messages to submerged Soviet submarines in times of nuclear war. This was among the many distinctive features of the Tu-142MR that allows it to communicate with satellites, airborne and ground-based command posts, and submarines. The aircraft replaced the Ilyushin Il-80 in the airborne command and control role. Tu-142s are currently operated by the 76th Naval Aviation Regiment from Kipelovo. Other developments of the Tu-142 include the one-off Tu-142MRT maritime reconnaissance variant, and the unbuilt Tu-142MS missile-carrying variant. Russian maritime patrol aircraft (MPAs) Tupolev Tu-142MZ/MR ('Bear F/J') of the Northern Fleet are being equipped with datalinks to enable them to receive targeting feeds from Russian Naval Aviation Israel Aerospace Industries (IAI) Forpost unmanned aerial vehicles (UAVs).

Operational history

To prepare for Tu-142 operations, on  the Soviet Navy began selecting personnel for conversion training. Meanwhile, the first Tu-142s were delivered to the Northern Fleet at Kipelovo AB, where they were initially tasked with tracking and monitoring nuclear-powered submarines as part of the type's operational trials. Throughout the test programme, effort focused on the verification of the ASW avionics, notably the Berkut-95 radar, as the airframe itself was not a major concern. The Tu-142 reached initial operational capability in  after a successful flight-test programme. Deliveries of the aircraft at first proceeded slowly; as more Tu-142s were produced, the type was allocated to the Pacific Fleet.

Throughout its operational history, the Tu-142 demonstrated significant capabilities. On , four Tu-142s shadowed a foreign submarine in the Barents Sea; one of the aircraft was reported to have maintained continuous contact for 2 hours and 55 minutes. In 1975, a Tu-142 managed to trail a Soviet submarine for 3 hours and 16 minutes. On , a group of five Tu-142s tracked a US submarine in the Philippine Sea; one of the Tu-142s reportedly trailed the submarine for 4 hours and 5 minutes. Soviet Tu-142s, besides operating domestically, were sent to friendly overseas bases in Angola, Cuba, Ethiopia, Vietnam, and South Yemen. In the early 1990s, with the dissolution of the Soviet Union, the Soviet fleet of Tu-142s was handed to the Russian Navy, although the Ukrainian Air Force gained a few Tu-142s that had been left in its territory. Ukrainian Tu-142s were later dismantled as a result of the bilateral START I treaty signed between the United States and the Soviet Union in 1991, which came into effect in late 1994.

Besides the Tu-142's military applications, a one-off Tu-142MP was used to test a new ASW suite. Another Tu-142 was converted to replace the Tu-95LL for the testing of turbojet engines. Designated Tu-142LL, the ASW equipment and armament were removed to allow an engine test bed to be carried under the belly. Some of the engines installed were the NK-25 for the Tu-22MZ, RD36-51A for the Tu-144D, and the NK-32 for the Tu-160. The first Tu-142MK was converted for an airborne laboratory role, setting several altitude-in-horizontal and time-to-climb records in its class.

In 1981 the Indian Navy began considering a long-range maritime reconnaissance and anti-submarine warfare aircraft for its Naval Air Arm. The Soviet Union initially offered to refurbish some of its own Tu-142s for India, rather than construct new aircraft. The Indian Navy was at first hesitant about the large Tu-142, which was heavy and thus would require runways to be reinforced and lengthened at potential operating bases. Consequently, the service requested three Ilyushin Il-38s – then being phased out of service with the Soviet Navy – be refurbished for Indian operations. This request fell through, and so in  an agreement to purchase eight Tu-142s was signed.

On , the first three Tu-142s arrived at the Indian naval air station of INS Hansa, Goa, after a flight from Simferopol (Gvardeyskoye Air Base) in the Crimean peninsula. On  two more aircraft arrived, prior to the commissioning of INAS 312, the operator of Indian Tu-142s; by the end of October the fleet of eight Tu-142s was delivered. In , the squadron was relocated to its current operating base at INS Rajali on the Indian east coast. The Tu-142s were replaced by twelve smaller Boeing P-8Is. The Indian Navy retired the last three operational aircraft on 29 March 2017.

In 2020, two Tupolev Tu-142s were intercepted by RAF Typhoons near British Airspace.

Variants

Tu-142 A lengthened Tu-95 with much defensive armament removed, and instead incorporating ASW systems. Twelve aircraft initially had 12-wheel main undercarriage bogies. Six later aircraft had four-wheel bogies. Built by Kuibyshev Aviation Plant.

Tu-142M A 30-centimetre (12 in) stretch to front fuselage, redesigned cockpit and two-axle main undercarriage bogies. Built by Taganrog.

Tu-142MK Greatly improved variant with new Korshun radar, avionics and ASW equipment. 43 Tu-142MKs were constructed by Taganrog.

Tu-142MK-E Eight downgraded Tu-142MKs purchased by the Indian Naval Air Arm. E stands for "export".

Tu-142MZ The last production variant of the "Bear F", with new NK-12MP engines and a new avionics suite. Can be distinguished from other Tu-142s by its chin fairings. Built by Taganrog.

Tu-142MZ-K Proposed commercial cargo variant of the Tu-142M3 (the K standing for "kommercheskiy"), with ASW avionics removed. Also designated Tu-142M3-C.

Tu-142MP Modified single Tu-142M used as avionics testbed.

Tu-142MR Modified Tu-142MKs built as submarine communications relay aircraft. Has distinctive external fairings and components. NATO codename "Bear J".

Tu-142LL Two converted earlier Tu-142s used for testing of turbofan engines. ASW equipment was removed.

Operators

 Russian Naval Aviation – 22 Tu-142MZ/MR/MK in service. The Russian Navy plans to upgrade the Tu-142 anti-submarine aircraft with installation of the SVP-24 bombing system.
 7062nd Port-Arthur Krasnoznamennaya Naval Aviation Air Base – Kamenny Ruchey, Khabarovsk Krai
 568th Composite Aviation Regiment
 2nd Guards Aviation Group – Fedotovo (air base), Vologda Oblast
 403rd Composite Aviation Regiment

Former operators

 Soviet Air Forces – aircraft were transferred to the Russian Naval Aviation after the dissolution of the Soviet Union. Some remained at the territory of Ukraine.
 35th Long-Range Anti-Submarine Aviation Division – Fedotovo (air base), Vologda Oblast, Russian SFSR
 76th Long-Range Anti-Submarine Aviation Regiment
 135th Long-Range Anti-Submarine Aviation Regiment
 310th independent Long-Range Anti-Submarine Aviation Regiment – Kamenny Ruchey, Khabarovsk Krai, Russian SFSR

 Mykolaiv Aircraft Repair Plant – there were no aviation regiments equipped with Tu-142s in the Ukrainian SSR, but unknown number of Tu-142s were left at the Mykolaiv Aircraft Repair Plant following the collapse of the Soviet Union. The Mykolaiv Aircraft Repair Plant was providing repairs for number types of Soviet aircraft including the Tu-142. Some aircraft later returned to their permanent bases in Russia, the remaining were dismantled in accordance with the START I agreement.
 1 Tu-142MZ in the Ukraine State Aviation Museum.
 1 Tu-142 in the Aviation Technical Museum (Luhansk).

 Indian Naval Air Arm – operated 8 former Soviet Tu-142MK-E aircraft from March 1988 to March 2017 (29 years). The aircraft were retired on 27 March 2017 during a ceremony held at the INS Rajali air base. They were replaced with the Boeing P-8 Poseidon aircraft.
 INAS 312 – INS Rajali, Tamil Nadu
 1 Tu-142M is preserved as a museum for public access opposite to the INS Kursura (S20) museum on the Beach Road, Visakhapatnam.
 1 Tu-142MK-E is preserved as a museum for public access in the Naval Aircraft Museum, New Town Kolkata.

Notable accidents
On , eleven crew were killed when their Tu-142 crashed on the Northwest Pacific coast of Russia over the Strait of Tartary between the island of Sakhalin and Khabarovsk region during a training flight. Flights of aircraft belonging to the Pacific Fleet were suspended pending an investigation into the crash. There was no indication that the crew made use of emergency equipment, although a lifeboat on board the plane was fitted with a device that transmits a signal in the event of an accident. Chief of the General Staff Nikolay Makarov believed an engine failure could have caused the crash. A search for the bodies of the eleven crew members was suspended several times due to ice floes and bad weather.

Specifications (Tu-142MZ)

References

Citations

Bibliography

External links

Tu-142 Bear at GlobalSecurity.org
Тu-142 at Airwar.ru 

Aircraft with contra-rotating propellers
1960s Soviet patrol aircraft
Tu-0142
Four-engined tractor aircraft
Four-engined turboprop aircraft
High-wing aircraft
Aircraft first flown in 1968